Strangford Road is a cricket ground in Downpatrick, Northern Ireland, and is the home of Downpatrick Cricket Club. It has hosted fifteen Ireland international matches, most recently against Australia "A" and South Africa in 1998.

References

External links
Cricket Archive

Cricket grounds in Northern Ireland
Sports venues in County Down